The Skimmer is an American sailing dinghy, that was designed by William F. Crosby for amateur construction in 1933.

Design
The Skimmer design conforms to the original Moth class rules, but with an emphasis on simplicity for ease of construction and to reduce building costs. Crosby was the editor of Rudder magazine at the time and had designed the Snipe in 1931. He published the plans for the Skimmer in the October and November 1933 issues of that magazine, during the height of the Great Depression, as a means of producing a sailboat for the least cost. As a consequence, hundreds of examples were built and they were raced as a class on the United States west coast and other places in the US.

The Skimmer is a small, single-handed, recreational dinghy, built predominantly of wood planking. It has a catboat single-sail rig, a single chine hull, a transom-hung rudder and a pivoting centreboard keel. It displaces  and carries no ballast.

See also
List of sailing boat types

Related development
Moth (dinghy)

References

Dinghies
1930s sailboat type designs
Sailing yachts
Sailboat type designs by William F. Crosby